The ekpyrotic universe is a cosmological model of the early universe that explains the origin of the large-scale structure of the cosmos. The model has also been incorporated in the cyclic universe theory (or ekpyrotic cyclic universe theory), which proposes a complete cosmological history, both the past and future.

Origins 

The original ekpyrotic model was introduced by Justin Khoury, Burt Ovrut, Paul Steinhardt and Neil Turok in 2001.

Steinhardt created the name based on the Ancient Greek word ekpyrosis (ἐκπύρωσις, "conflagration"), which refers to a Stoic cosmological model in which the universe is caught in an eternal cycle of fiery birth, cooling and rebirth.

The theory addresses the fundamental question that remains unanswered by the Big Bang inflationary model, "What happened before the Big Bang?" The explanation, according to the ekpyrotic theory, is that the Big Bang was actually a big bounce, a transition from a previous epoch of contraction to the present epoch of expansion. The key events that shaped our universe occurred before the bounce, and, in a cyclic version, the universe bounces at regular intervals.

Applications of the theory 

The original ekpyrotic models relied on string theory, branes and extra dimensions, but most contemporary ekpyrotic and cyclic models use the same physical ingredients as inflationary models (quantum fields evolving in ordinary space-time). Like Big Bang cosmology, the ekpyrotic theory has accurately described essential features of our universe. It predicts a uniform, flat universe with patterns of hot spots and cold spots, in agreement with observations of the cosmic microwave background (CMB), observations confirmed to higher precision by the WMAP and Planck satellite experiments. Observation of a CMB has long been considered evidence of the Big Bang, but proponents of the ekpyrotic and cyclic theories contend that the CMB is also consistent with a Big Bounce as posited in those models. Other researchers argue that data from the Planck observations of the CMB "significantly limit the viable parameter space of the ekpyrotic/cyclic scenarios." Primordial gravitational waves, if ever observed, may help scientists distinguish between various theories about the origin of the universe.

Implications for cosmology 

An advantage of ekpyrotic and cyclic models is that they do not produce a multiverse. This is important because when the effects of quantum fluctuations are properly included in the Big Bang inflationary model, they prevent the universe from achieving the uniformity and flatness that the cosmologists are trying to explain. Instead, inflated quantum fluctuations cause the universe to break up into patches with every conceivable combination of physical properties. Instead of making clear predictions, the Big Bang inflationary theory allows any outcome, so that the properties we observe may be viewed as random chance, resulting from the particular patch of the multiverse in which the Earth resides. Most regions of the multiverse would have very different properties.

Nobel laureate Steven Weinberg has suggested that if the multiverse is true, “the hope of finding a rational explanation for the precise values of quark masses and other constants of the standard model that we observe in our Big Bang is doomed, for their values would be an accident of the particular part of the multiverse in which we live.”

The idea that the properties of our universe are an accident and come from a theory that allows a multiverse of other possibilities is hard to reconcile with the fact that the universe is extraordinarily simple (uniform and flat) on large scales and that elementary particles appear to be described by simple symmetries and interactions. Also, the accidental concept cannot be falsified by an experiment since any future experiments can be viewed as yet other accidental aspects.

In ekpyrotic and cyclic models, smoothing and flattening occurs during a period of slow contraction, so quantum fluctuations are not inflated and cannot produce a multiverse. As a result, the ekpyrotic and cyclic models predict simple physical properties that are consistent with current experimental evidence without producing a multiverse.

See also 
 Cosmic inflation
 Cyclic model
 Physical cosmology

Notes and references

Further reading 
 
 A Brief Introduction to the Ekpyrotic Universe by Steinhardt, Paul J., Department of Physics, Princeton University.
 Greene, Brian, The Elegant Universe: Superstrings, Hidden Dimensions, and the Quest for the Ultimate Theory, Vintage (2000).
  (the first paper to point out problems with the theory).
 Whitehouse, David, "Before the Big Bang". BBC News. April 10, 2001.
 Discover Magazine, Before the Big Bang February 2004 issue.
 Parallel Universes, (BBC Two, 9 February 14, 2002).
 'Brane-Storm' Challenges Part of Big Bang Theory.
 Yi-Fu Cai, Damien A. Easson, Robert Brandenberger, Towards a Nonsingular Bouncing Cosmology, arXiv:1206.2382, (June 2012).

Astrophysics
Physical cosmology